Rudolf Martin (born 1967) is a German actor working mainly in the United States.  Other people named Rudolf Martin include:

 Martin Brendel (1862–1939), full name Otto Rudolf Martin Brendel, a German astronomer
 Rudolf Martin (anthropologist) (1864–1925), a Swiss anthropologist
 Rudolf Martin Meelführer (1670–1729), a German Hebraist

See also 
 Rudolph Martin Anderson (1876–1961), a Canadian zoologist